Clem Tholet (1948 – 6 October 2004) was a Rhodesian folk singer who became popular in the 1970s for his Rhodesian patriotic songs. He reached the height of his fame during the Rhodesian Bush War.

Biography

Clem Tholet was born in Salisbury, Southern Rhodesia in 1948, and began writing songs while he was an art student in Durban, South Africa. One of his first songs, Vagabond Gun was a category winner at the South Africa Music Festival in 1966. Tholet later moved back to Rhodesia to work in advertising. He started singing at Rhodesia's first folk venue, The Troubadour in Salisbury's Angwa Street. Whilst performing there, he met Sue Eccles and Andy Dillon. The trio formed a group called The Kinfolk, then moved to South Africa, and shortly after moving to Johannesburg, Eccles left the group.

Tholet and Dillon formed a new group with Yvonne Raff, which they called The Legend Trio. This new trio began singing at the original Southern African "Troubadour", and were also involved in a number of SAFMA's National Folk Fests.

Tholet married Jean Smith (step-daughter of Rhodesian Prime Minister Ian Smith) in 1967.

Tholet embarked on a solo career, recording some singles with Art Heatlie at Trutone. Mel Miller, Peter Leroy and Sylvia Stott briefly joined Tholet to form a group in 1970, before Tholet moved back to Rhodesia in 1971. Tholet returned and soon built up a strong following. He did a series of Rhodesian Television shows, and presented a radio programme called Folk on the Rocks, aired for two series. The name came from the folk club Tholet ran at The Beverley Rocks, where it played to regular packed houses.

A popular star of the annual Bless 'Em All Troop Shows, and in great demand in the Rhodesian entertainment scene, Tholet recorded his first album Songs of Love & War at Shed Studios. Tholet wrote and produced the album himself.  The album was awarded a Gold Disc. He wrote the soundtrack and songs for the C.I.S. film What A Time it Was  and the theme song for a film honouring the wounded troopies of Rhodesia, Tsanga, Tsanga.

He appeared at the 7 Arts Theatre, Harare in the first half, supporting the American comedian Shelley Berman with members of the Shed Studios band – consisting of Martin Norris, Steve Roskilly, Bothwell Nyamhondera, Tony Logan and Steve Hughes. As artistic director of the advertising agency Matthewman Banks and Tholet, he was instrumental in writing a great many and memorable music jingles for his clients. He produced a second album at Shed Studios, called Two Sides to Every Story, before moving back to South Africa. After living and working in the advertising industry for many years in Cape Town, Tholet died on 6 October 2004 after having suffered from the effects of a debilitating illness for a number of years.

Tholet's last album, Archives was (and is) sold as a fundraiser to benefit the Flame Lily Foundation. This fundraising project seeks to provide funds for the living expenses of elderly former residents of Zimbabwe and Rhodesia living in South Africa, who have been denied their pensions by the Zimbabwean government.

Discography

Albums

Singles

Film tracks

See also

John Edmond

References

Further reading

 Includes Clem Tholet's self-penned obituary "Goodbye".

1948 births
2004 deaths
Ian Smith
White Rhodesian people
Zimbabwean exiles
Zimbabwean people of British descent
People from Harare
Rhodesian composers
Rhodesian guitarists
Rhodesian singers
Rhodesian military personnel
Zimbabwean expatriates in South Africa
South African composers
South African male composers
South African folk musicians
South African guitarists
Male guitarists
20th-century South African male singers
20th-century guitarists
Expatriate musicians in South Africa